The 1960 United States Senate election in Delaware took place on November 8, 1960. Incumbent Democratic U.S. Senator J. Allen Frear Jr. ran for re-election to a third term in office, but was narrowly defeated by Republican Governor of Delaware J. Caleb Boggs.

General election

Candidates
J. Caleb Boggs, Governor of Delaware (Republican)
J. Allen Frear Jr., incumbent U.S. Senator (Democratic)

Results

See also 
 1960 United States Senate elections

References

Delaware
1960
1960 Delaware elections